Geoffrey Lee (born ) is an Australian politician. He has served as the Minister for Corrections in the Perrottet ministry since December 2021. He has previously served as the Minister for Skills and Tertiary Education in the second Berejiklian and Perrottet ministries between April 2019 and December 2021. Lee is also a member of the New South Wales Legislative Assembly representing Parramatta for the Liberal Party since 2011.

Early years and background
Geoff Lee was born in 1967 and has an Anglo-Celtic Australian and Chinese Australian background. He attained a Bachelor of Applied Science degree in horticulture from the University of Western Sydney – Hawkesbury and was managing director of Hambledon Garden Centre, a garden centre and landscaping business in Parramatta from 1992 until 2001. He completed his Master of Business Administration from Macquarie University's School of Business Administration in 2001 and commenced teaching part-time at Liverpool TAFE. From 2004 to 2006, Lee was a lecturer in business at the University of Western Sydney (UWS) and, during this time, completed a Doctor of Business Administration degree at the Macquarie Graduate School of Management. In 2007, he was appointed Associate Dean (Engagement) at UWS.

Political career
At the March 2011 elections, Lee was elected as member for Parramatta and received a swing of 25.8 points in the traditionally strong Labor seat.  Going into the election, Labor held Parramatta with a majority of 13.1 points.  As a measure of the size of the massive Coalition wave that swept New South Wales that year, Lee picked up a swing large enough to turn Parramatta from a very safe Labor seat into a very safe Liberal seat in one stroke.  He later said that could not have won—and certainly not with as large a swing—without winning over dozens of people who had never voted for a Liberal before.  He was re-elected in 2015 and 2019, becoming the first non-Labor member since the 1950 state election to have held the seat for more than one term.

Prior to the 2019 NSW state election in May, Lee served as Parliamentary Secretary to the Premier, Western Sydney and Multiculturalism from 1 Feb 2017 to 23 Mar 2019.

Following the 2019 state election, Lee was appointed as the Minister for Skills and Tertiary Education in the second Berejiklian ministry, with effect from 2 April 2019.

Amid an Independent Commission Against Corruption investigation into former sports minister John Sidoti in September 2019, Lee was appointed Acting Minister for Sport, Multiculturalism, Seniors and Veterans until the preliminary investigation concluded. Sidoti later resigned from Cabinet in March 2021 and "Lee will continue to act in those portfolios until I determine a replacement in the near future," according the NSW Premier Gladys Berejiklian. Following the October 2021 election of Dominic Perrottet as Leader of the NSW Liberal Party and his appointment as Premier, Perrottet reshuffled the ministry with effect from December 2021, where Lee was appointed as Minister for Corrections.

References

External links
Lee's campaign webpage
 

1960s births
Living people
Australian horticulturists
Australian people of Chinese descent
Australian people of English descent
Australian people of Scottish descent
Liberal Party of Australia members of the Parliament of New South Wales
Macquarie University alumni
Members of the New South Wales Legislative Assembly
People from Parramatta
Western Sydney University alumni
21st-century Australian politicians